Extracurricular is a South Korean streaming television series directed by Kim Jin-min, starring Kim Dong-hee, Park Ju-hyun, Jung Da-bin, Nam Yoon-su, Choi Min-soo, Park Hyuk-kwon, and Kim Yeo-jin. It was released on Netflix on April 29, 2020.

Cast

Main
 Kim Dong-hee as Oh Ji-soo
 Park Ju-hyun as Bae Gyu-ri
 Jung Da-bin as Seo Min-hee
 Nam Yoon-su as Kwak Ki-tae
 Choi Min-soo as Lee Wang-chul
 Park Hyuk-kwon as Cho Jin-woo
 Kim Yeo-jin as Lee Hae-gyoung

Recurring
 Seo Ye-hwa as Na Sung-mi
 Kim Yi-kyung as Kim Ji-ye
 Park Bo-mi as Cho Min-joo
 Jang Se-rim as Yoo Eun-chae
 Kwak Hee-joo as Lee Tae-rim
 Kim Gyu-tae as Lim Tae-woo
 Kwon Han-sol as Hye-min
 Woo Da-bi as Soo-ji
 Kang So-hee as Na-eun
 Lee Jae-baek as Kang-bbang
 Choi Joon-gyu as Chae-bin
 Kim Byung-hwi as Tae-nam
 Park Ho-san as Oh Jung-jin
 Shim Yi-young as Cho Hye-yeon, Gyu-ri's mother
 Kim Young-pil as Gyu-ri's father
 Baek Joo-hee as Cho Mi-jung
 Lim Gi-hong as Ryu Dae-yeol
 Kim Kwang-kyu as Nam Byung-kwan
 Lee Seung-woo as Kyung-shik
 Oh Kwang-rok as Jae-ik
 Lee Hyun-gul as Du-gi
 Cheon Dong-bin as Jung-hwan

Episodes

Production

Development
On April 22, 2019, Netflix announced through a press release that it would distribute a new Korean original series entitled Extracurricular and produced by Studio 329, confirming at the same time that the main cast would consist of Kim Dong-hee, Jung Da-bin, Park Ju-hyun, Nam Yoon-soo, Choi Min-soo, Park Hyuk-kwon and Kim Yeo-jin. The series is written by Song Ji-na's son Jin Han-sae and directed by Kim Jin-min, whose wife Kim Yeo-jin is starring in the series.

Filming
Filming, which ended on August 6, 2019, mostly took place in Seoul.

Promotion
On April 28, 2020, the press conference was held online due to the coronavirus pandemic, in presence of actors Kim Dong-hee, Jung Da-bin, Park Ju-hyun and Nam Yoon-soo, executive producer (and Studio 329's CEO) Yoon Shin-ae, and director Kim Jin-min. The series being released a few months after the Nth room case opened, director Kim said that "the incident was so shocking that [he] felt frightened. Extracurricular could become an opportunity to discuss this uncomfortable reality. As a creator, [he] felt [he] had to deal with the issues of our society with more depth and responsibility."

On April 29, some of the cast and crew attended a special one-day class by Professors Kwon Il-yong (South Korea's first profiler), Park Mi-rang (a criminologist) and Seo Min-soo (from the Police Human Resources Development Institute), which was broadcast live on Netflix Korea's YouTube and V Live channels. They discussed the reality of youth crime in society.

Release
On March 19, 2020, Netflix Korea announced through Twitter that the series would be released on April 29. On April 16, the official trailer was released.

Reception

Audience viewership
Extracurricular was the ninth most-watched South Korean series on Netflix in 2020.

Critical response
John Serba of Decider said that "Extracurricular is good, funny stuff. The debut episode's near-miss ending isn't entirely satisfying, but that's not likely to stop you from binging the crap out of this show."

The series has also "gained rave reviews for its clear depiction of the struggles of teenage students."

Awards and nominations

References

External links
 Extracurricular on Netflix
 
 

Korean-language Netflix original programming
2020 South Korean television series debuts
2020 South Korean television series endings
2020s teen drama television series
South Korean crime television series
Prostitution in television
Television series about bullying
Television shows set in Seoul
Television series set in 2020
South Korean pre-produced television series